Mirzec  is a village in Starachowice County, Świętokrzyskie Voivodeship, in south-central Poland. It is the seat of the gmina (administrative district) called Gmina Mirzec.

The village has a population of 2,100.

References

Villages in Starachowice County
Sandomierz Voivodeship
Radom Governorate
Kielce Voivodeship (1919–1939)